Milton Rodríguez (born 9 July 1954) is an Ecuadorian footballer. He played in five matches for the Ecuador national football team from 1979 to 1983. He was also part of Ecuador's squad for the 1979 Copa América tournament.

References

External links
 

1954 births
Living people
Ecuadorian footballers
Ecuador international footballers
Association football goalkeepers
Sportspeople from Guayaquil